Peter Best may refer to:
Pete Best (born 1941), original drummer for the Beatles
Peter Best (actor), actor who appeared in the Harry Potter film series as the Death Eater, Walden McNair
Peter Best (composer) (born 1943), Australian film composer
Peter B. Best (1939–2015), British marine mammalogist